Frederick Little Packer (January 4, 1886 – December 8, 1956) was an American illustrator and political cartoonist. Born in Los Angeles, he was educated at the Los Angeles School of Art and Design and the Chicago Art Institute. He worked for the Los Angeles Examiner, San Francisco Call, and from 1919 to 1931 worked as a commercial artist in New York. He returned to newspaper work on the New York Journal in 1932, and in 1933 joined the Daily Mirror.  He received the Pulitzer Prize for Editorial Cartooning in 1952.

Gallery

References

1886 births
1956 deaths
American editorial cartoonists
Pulitzer Prize for Editorial Cartooning winners
Artists from Los Angeles
Artists from New York City
20th-century American artists
American illustrators
School of the Art Institute of Chicago alumni